The Governor General's Award for English-language children's illustration is a Canadian literary award that annually recognizes one Canadian illustrator for a children's book written in English. It is one of four children's book awards among the Governor General's Awards for Literary Merit, one each for writers and illustrators of English- and French-language books. The Governor General's Awards program is administered by the Canada Council.

In name, this award is part of the Governor General's Award program only from 1987 but the four children's literature awards were established in 1975 under a Canada Council name. In the event, the "Canada Council" and "Governor General's" awards have recognized illustration in an English-language children's book every year from 1978.

Canada Council Children's Literature Prize 

In 1975 the Canada Council established four annual prizes of $5000 for the year's best English- and French-language children's books by Canadian writers and illustrators. Those 
"Canada Council Children's Literature Prizes" were continued under the "Governor General's Awards" rubric from 1987, and continue today. Among them the English-language illustration prize was awarded every year from 1978.

 1978: Ann Blades, A Salmon for Simon, written by Betty Waterton
 1979: László Gál, The Twelve Dancing Princesses, retold by Janet Lunn
 1980: Elizabeth Cleaver, Petrouchka: adapted from Igor Stravinsky and Alexandre Benois, Petrushka retold by Cleaver
 1981: Heather Woodall, Ytek and the Arctic Orchid: an Inuit legend, by Garnet Hewitt
 1982: Vlasta van Kampen, ABC/123: The Canadian Alphabet and Counting Book
 1983: László Gál, The Little Mermaid, retold by Margaret Crawford Maloney
 1984: Marie-Louise Gay, Lizzy's Lion, by Dennis Lee
 1985: Terry Gallagher, Murdo's Story, by Murdo Scribe
 1986: Barbara Reid, Have You Seen Birds?, by Joanne Oppenheim

Three of these winning English-language illustrators also won the annual Canadian Library Association award for children's book illustration, recognizing the same books. Their CLA Amelia Frances Howard-Gibbon Illustrator's Awards are dated one year later: Blades 1979, Gál 1980, and Woodall 1982. The Howard-Gibbon award was inaugurated in 1971 for 1970 publications.

Six illustrators listed below, winners of the English-language illustration award under the "Governor General's" name, also won the CLA award for the same book: Gay 1988, LaFave 1989, Morin 1991, Lightburn 1992, Reid 1998, and Denton 1999.

1980s

1990s

2000s

2010s

2020s

See also 

 Governor General's Award for English-language children's literature
 Governor General's Award for French-language children's illustration
 Governor General's Award for French-language children's literature

References

Picture book awards

Awards established in 1987
1987 establishments in Canada
Children English
English-language literary awards